The Men's Individual Time Trial at the 2003 UCI Road World Championships was the 10th edition of the event. The race took place on 9 October 2003 in Hamilton, Canada. The race was initially won by David Millar of Great Britain. Following Millar's confession of doping, the win was attributed to Michael Rogers of Australia.

Final classification

References

Men's Time Trial
UCI Road World Championships – Men's time trial